DuBose or Dubose can refer to:

Surname
 Artist Dubose (born 1995), American rapper known professionally as A Boogie wit da Hoodie
Demetrius DuBose (1971–1999), American football player
Doug DuBose (born 1964), American football player
Eric DuBose (born 1976), American Baseball player
Hampden Coit DuBose (1845–1910), Presbyterian missionary in China
Horace Mellard DuBose (1858–1941), American bishop of the Methodist Episcopal Church
Jimmy DuBose (born 1954), American football player
Judith DuBose (1698-1769), Colonial American heiress
Kristi DuBose (born 1964), American jurist and judge
Mike DuBose (born 1953), American football player 
Samuel Vincent DuBose (c. 1972–2015), shooting victim, Cincinnati, Ohio
Thomas DuBose (1902-1992,) US Air Force officer
William DuBose (politician) (c. 1786–1855), American politician from South Carolina
William Porcher DuBose (1836–1918), American priest and theologian in the Episcopal Church
Winston DuBose, American soccer player

Given name
DuBose Heyward (1885–1940), American author best known for his 1925 novel Porgy
DuBose Porter (born 1953), Democratic member of the Georgia House of Representatives 
DuBose Ausley (born 1937), American attorney in Tallahassee, Florida

Place
Dubose Heyward House, a home of author Dubose Heyward
DuBose Conference Center, a historic site at Fairmont and College Streets in Monteagle, Tennessee

Fiction
Kudzu Dubose, character in the comic strip Kudzu
Mrs. Dubose, character in the novel To Kill a Mockingbird
Vonn Dubose, character in the novel The Whistler

See also
Dubois (disambiguation)
Dubos, a French surname
Dubosc, a surname